Doris Tetzlaff [″Tetz″] (January 1, 1921 – April 11, 1998) was an infielder and chaperone in the All-American Girls Professional Baseball League. Listed at 5'5", 155 lb., she batted and threw right-handed.

Little is known about this woman who played different roles during ten years in the All-American Girls Professional Baseball League. A native of Watertown, Wisconsin, Tetzlaff came from a family of German origin. She was a valuable utility, playing mainly at third base for five different teams from  through .

Tetzlaff entered the league in 1944 with the Milwaukee Chicks, playing for them one year before joining the Grand Rapids Chicks (1945–1947), Chicago Colleens (1948), Fort Wayne Daisies (1948) and Muskegon Lassies (1949).
 
Tetzlaff also went to the playoffs in all of her ten seasons in the league, being a member of two champion teams in 1944 and 1947.

Doris Tetzlaff died in Iola, Wisconsin, at the age of 77.

Batting statistics

Sources

All-American Girls Professional Baseball League players
Baseball infielders
American people of German descent
Baseball players from Wisconsin
People from Watertown, Wisconsin
1921 births
1998 deaths
20th-century American women
20th-century American people